The Croydon power stations refers to a pair of demolished coal-fired power stations and to a gas-fired power station in the Purley Way area of Croydon, London.

The coal-fired stations operated from 1896 until 1984, and the gas-fired station opened in 2005. Croydon B power station's chimneys have been retained as a local landmark.

History

Croydon A
The first power station built on the site, which would later become known as Croydon A power station, was opened in 1896. The station was built near Croydon Gas Works by the Croydon Corporation. The generating equipment at the station was replaced in 1924, when low pressure equipment of 21 megawatts (MW) and high pressure equipment of 29 MW was installed, giving the station a generating capacity of 50 MW. This corresponded with the arrival of English Electric Type 3B locomotive No.692 (a steeplecab design built in 1925) which used an overhead wire electric system, for the shunting of coal. In 1959 this was supplemented with a backup steam locomotive from Littlebrook Power Station, built by W. G. Bagnall in 1946. In 1970, Croydon A was rarely active and was one of the few power stations in the country to still have wooden cooling towers on site but 2 concrete towers were in use at time of closure. It operated until 1972.

The generating capacity, maximum load, and electricity generated and sold was as follows:

Technical Specification
In 1923 the AC plant comprised: 1 × 3,000 kW and 2 × 5,000 kW turbo-alternators. The DC supply was generated by 1 × 750 kW and 1 × 1,000 kW reciprocating engines and generators. The total installed generating capacity was 14,750 kW. The boiler plant produced a total of 101,000 lb/hr (12.73 kg/s) of steam. A range of currents and voltages was available:

 3-phase AC 230 & 400V
 1-phase AC 200 & 400V
 DC 230 & 460V
 DC traction current 550V

In 1923 the station generated 16.555 GWh of electricity, some of this was used in the plant, the total amount sold was 12.593 GWh. The revenue from sales of current was £166,345, this gave a surplus of revenue over expenses of £98,742.

By 1963-64 the A station had 1 × 30 MW generator. The steam capacity of the boilers was 775,000 lb/hr (97.6 kg/s). The steam conditions at the turbine stop valve were 265 / 490 psi (18.3 / 33.8 bar) and 416 / 427 °C. The overall thermal efficiency of the A station in 1963-64 was 15.33 per cent.

Electricity output from Croydon A power station during its final years of operation was as follows.

Croydon A annual electricity output GWh.

Croydon B

Planning for a Croydon B power station was begun in 1939, with the architecture designed by Robert Atkinson. However, these plans were delayed by World War II. Immediately after the end of the war, construction work began on the new station. The station was built by Sir Robert McAlpine & Sons, who also used two locomotives during the construction work; the first was Hudswell Clarke No.82, used between 1946 and 1948, the second was Hudswell Clarke No.55, used for the remainder of 1948. The station was finally opened in 1950.

The station originally had a generating capacity of 198 MW, but in 1972, a 140 MW gas turbine was installed at for peak use, bringing the generating capacity up to 338 MW. The gas turbine plant comprised two 70 MW sets with a total capability of 140 MW. These were operated as required at times of peak load. The load factor (the average load as a percentage of the average maximum output capacity) for these machines were generally below 5 per cent.

Once delivered to the station, coal was shunted by locomotives. Croydon B had a fleet of three shunting locomotives, all built by Peckett and Sons with the works numbers No.2103, No.2104 and No.2105. These three steam locomotives were superseded by diesels in the 1960s.

Coal was brought to the station by rail, but during the 1970s coal was sometimes shipped down the coast from Northumberland to Kingsnorth and then transported to Croydon in up to twenty-five 10 ton lorries per day.

It was decommissioned in 1984, and in a disused state was used in the filming of parts of Terry Gilliam's 1985 film Brazil. The station was demolished in 1991 and an IKEA store was opened on the site. Two large chimneys were retained: they are now capped with blue and yellow bands (IKEA's corporate colours), and remain a local landmark.

Technical Specification
By 1963–64 the B station had 4 × 52.5 MW generators. The steam capacity of the boilers was 2,560,000 lb/hr (322.6 kg/s). Steam conditions at the turbine stop valve were 600 psi (41.4 bar) and 454 °C. In 1963-64 the overall thermal efficiency of the B station was 24.58 per cent.

Electricity output from Croydon B power station during its final years of operation was as follows.

Croydon B annual electricity output GWh.Electricity output from Croydon B Gas Turbine plant was as follows.

Croydon B Gas Turbine plant annual electricity output GWh.

Gas-fired station
In 1999 permission was given for an 80 MW gas-fired station at the gas-holder site at Factory Lane, about half a mile to the south-east of the 'B' station site.

The gas turbine station started operation in 2005. It was owned by Rolls-Royce Power Developments Ltd and was initially operated by Rolls-Royce Energy. It consists of an open cycle gas turbine (OCGT), a Rolls-Royce Trent engine, and generates 50 MW of electricity. The engine operates on gas at a pressure of 19 bar; the thermal efficiency is about 36 per cent. The machine is used at peak time of demand and runs less than 1000 hours per annum.

In 2009 there was a proposal to use the waste heat from the gas turbine exhaust gases to operate a 35 MW combined heat and power (CHP) system delivering hot water to a district heating system. This would be achieved by taking heat from the exhaust gases at 444 °C and cooling them to 180 °C, using a finned tube heat exchanger.

As of 2020 the gas turbine station is being operated by RWE on behalf of a customer.

The Valley Park Retail and Leisure Complex

In 1992, the area was regenerated into what is now known as the Valley Park Retail and Leisure Complex.

References

Coal-fired power stations in England
Demolished power stations in the United Kingdom
Former power stations in London
Natural gas-fired power stations in England
Power stations in London